Azur Lane is a side-scrolling shoot 'em up video game created by Chinese developers Shanghai Manjuu and Xiamen Yongshi, released in 2017 for the iOS and Android operating systems. Set in an alternate timeline of World War II, players engage in side-scrolling shooter gameplay, using female moe anthropomorphic characters based on warships from the war's major participants. Other gameplay elements, like customizing a dorm and in-game characters, are also present.

First launched in China in May and in Japan in September 2017, Azur Lane quickly became popular, especially in Japan where the player count reached five million within four months after its release. Players have voted the game among the top five on Google Play's Best Game of 2017 list for the region. Critics have attributed the game's popularity to its original and well-designed gameplay system. An English version started open beta in August 2018 and was formally released in May 2019. Later, in December 2019, the English version was expanded to Latin American region. PWB Play simultaneously released it to Hong Kong, Macau, and Taiwan in October 2019.

The game has been adapted into several manga and novelizations. Azur Lane Crosswave, a 3D adaptation for PlayStation 4, was published by Compile Heart in August 2019 with mixed reception. Crosswave English localization was released in February 2020 for PlayStation 4 and PC. A Nintendo Switch port of the game was released in Japan in September 2020, and in February 2021 in North America and in February 2021 in Europe.

An anime television series adaptation by Bibury Animation Studios was announced in 2018, and was aired from October 2019 to March 2020. Funimation licensed this series for a SimulDub. An anime television series adaptation of the Azur Lane: Slow Ahead! manga by studios CANDYBOX and Yostar Pictures aired from January to March 2021. An OVA adaptation of the Azur Lane: Queen's Orders manga has been announced.

Gameplay

Azur Lane is a side-scrolling shoot 'em up, simulation and role-playing video game. Players collect characters that are moe anthropomorphic interpretations of World War II warships ("shipgirls"), mainly from the United States Navy, Royal Navy, Imperial Japanese Navy and Kriegsmarine, with other ships from the French Navy (both Vichy and Free France flavors), Republic of China Navy, People's Liberation Army Navy, Regia Marina, Soviet Navy, Imperial Russian Navy, and Imperial German Navy being added later. Players organize them into fleets of six and confront AI-controlled enemies or other players' fleets. These ships can gain experience points (EXP) from various methods (such as from battles, completing commissions, or placing these ships into Dormitories), and they require a certain amount of EXP to gain a stronger level. They have a certain maximum level limit on how far players can level up their ships, which can be increased via Limit Break. Most characters have their own set of upgradable abilities that can be activated in battle.

Personifications of American destroyer USS Laffey (DD-459), British destroyer HMS Javelin and German destroyer Z23 (Chinese, English release) or Japanese destroyer Ayanami (Japanese, Korean release) are available for players to select as a starter ship. They are referred to as protagonists in-game. , more than 450 characters have been introduced to the game, representing ships from nine countries that participated in the war. The game is also notable for including preserved museum ships as its characters such as Japanese Mikasa and Russian Aurora.

A new game mode "Operation Siren" was announced on Twitter on December 13, 2020, for a late December release.

Battle

When preparing for the game's main mode, players can organize two fleets (as the game progresses, they will unlock up to a maximum of 6 fleets) consisting of a front row and a back row, with three slots available in each row. Destroyers, light cruisers, and heavy cruisers can be allotted to the front row, while the back row is reserved for battleships, aircraft cruiser, monitors, repair ships, battlecruisers and aircraft carriers. Different combinations of ships are required to achieve victory in different battle situations. Players may then select and enter a map.

On entering a map, the player's fleet is placed on a grid-like map similar to that in the game Battleship. The map contains nodes, which are either combat nodes which are enemy fleets, some immobile and others that pursue the player, or non-combat nodes which provides ammunition or mystery nodes which can provide supplies such as repair kits, upgrade materials or can spawn a special combat node called a Treasure Fleet. Players must navigate optimally and assemble their fleets tactically, to clear obstructing enemies and, using minimal movements, reach the map's boss. When the player moves their fleet across the map, they can be ambushed in random encounters from which they may take damage, or they can be forced to engage the enemy, using fuel and ammo. Fuel is one of the two in-game resources. Ammo points are assigned to player fleets at each map, with one ammo point deducted at each battle. Fleets that run out of ammo can still fight but may only deal half damage.

When battling an enemy, players can use a virtual joystick to control the front row, which can automatically fire shells at targets and manually launch torpedoes. While stationary, the back row can send shell barrages and the player can manually call in airstrikes. These will activate a bullet-clearing effect, removing all projectiles and torpedoes on screen. Players have an auto mode option to give up this control to the game's AI. Characters' health is fully replenished when completing or exiting a map. Morale points are deducted for each fleet character in a battle. Should a character fall in battle, they cannot join in further action on the map and a larger number of morale points are deducted for the fallen character at the end of the battle. Sustained low morale for a character decreases their stats and affection points. Low affection points lead the character to greet the player with vocals reflecting their disappointment.

The game features a player versus player mode. The player may prepare a defence fleet and organize an offence fleet to challenge opposing players' defence fleets. In this mode, battles are controlled entirely by AI, and the bullet-clearing effect of airstrikes is disabled. Tokens can be gained and the player's ranking can rise through victory in this mode. Players receive no penalty if they lose a challenge or their defence fleet is defeated by other players. Exclusive characters and other items can be obtained using tokens (which is called Merits). The ranking is refreshed every 15 days.

Additional mechanics were introduced after the game's release. Submarine and anti-submarine warfare systems were introduced in May 2018. This included anti-submarine campaign maps, and characters based on German U-boats, and American and Japanese submarines. A ship's cat system was introduced in September 2018. Various cat breeds can be obtained at a cattery. They can be trained to provide buffs when brought along with fleets to battle.

Dormitory
The game sports a "Dormitory" feature. Characters in their chibi forms may be put in the furnished Dormitory where they can walk around and sit, sleep, or bathe. Characters may passively gain experience points and recover morale when they are given food by players. Players can purchase food using fuel or in-game currency. Players can also purchase variously themed, and occasionally time-limited, furniture sets and decorations using "furniture coins" obtained by sending characters through special quests. Furniture and decorations raise the rate experience is gained. They can be arranged freely. Players may increase Dormitory character capacity, unlock a second floor which recovers morale, and buy special interactive furniture using the in-game currency.  As well, monuments can be awarded by clearing event stages. Players may inspect other players' Dormitories.

Oath
When a character's affection (which act as another form of levelling in game) points are raised to 100 through battle, secretary, or Dormitory, players may choose to give a "promise ring" to this character. A "promise ring" can be obtained through quests once. Additional rings can be purchased using in-game currency in the items shop. The developers also give out these rings for free during special occasions. Players may also give customized names to these characters but may only do so every 30 days for each character. Furthermore, a few of the most popular characters will also gain unique wedding dress costumes for the wedding. They will also gain additional stat bonuses after being given the promise ring.

Synopsis
The start of the game features an anthropomorphic recreation of the Battle of the Denmark Strait, where the personification of famed British battlecruiser HMS Hood is sunk by characters representing the German forces. The game features an eponymous military alliance, the "Azur Lane", formed and comprised by the nations of Eagle Union (United States), Royal Navy (United Kingdom), Sakura Empire (Empire of Japan), Iron Blood (Nazi Germany), Dragon Empery (Republic of China), Northern Parliament (Soviet Union), Iris Orthodoxy (France), and Sardegna Empire (Kingdom of Italy). The alliance split in two because of an alien intervention, with the Iron Blood, Sakura Empire, and Sardegna Empire forming the opposing "Crimson Axis" faction. Using technology provided by the aliens called as "Sirens", the Crimson Axis invades their former allies. As the result many Azur Lane's territories came under occupation of the Crimson Axis, with the Iris Orthodoxy was spilt into Iris Libre (Free France) and Vichya Dominion (Vichy France). The rest of the game's main plot partially follows the United States naval engagements in the Pacific War. Chapters represent several decisive battles of the war including the Battle of Midway, the Naval Battle of Guadalcanal, and the Mariana and Palau Islands campaign.

Development
Azur Lanes producer, Yuwan, a well-known uploader to the Chinese video sharing website Bilibili, began developing the game with five of his college friends, with the initial notion of "creating a doujin game, if a commercial one is not possible". Seeing many similar games created in Greater China after Kantai Collections success, the developers aimed to create "something different from previous works of ship moe anthropomorphism". As such, they intentionally avoided using a turn-based strategy game mechanic like that used by Kantai Collection and most of its followers. They also shifted the focus on Japanese ships to those from other countries involved in World War II.

One particular difficulty was incorporating shoot 'em up elements, as there were no existing works to reference. An early version of the game featured a combat system of a five-character fleet in a single or double column line of battle. World of Warships, a World War II naval warfare simulation game popular in China, influenced some of the gameplay design.

The developers sought to further differentiate the game by featuring characters based on preserved museum ships from earlier times, such as the pre-dreadnought battleship Mikasa of World War I, which was served as a flagship during the Russo-Japanese war, and the Russian protected cruiser Aurora, the ship famed for its October Revolution involvement. Keeping game balance and rarity with these characters was difficult, however, the developers were intent on featuring museum ships, and intend to introduce more characters like this in the future. A series of characters based on proposed or unfinished World War II warships, including Neptune, Saint-Louis and Ibuki, were introduced as part of a collaboration with Wargaming, publisher of World of Warships.

Many young voice actors, some critically acclaimed, lent their talents to the game. The decision to employ an all-Japanese voice cast with a focus on younger actors was the result of a lack of professional voice actors in China, as well as the team's intention to give younger Japanese actors opportunities to perform. The game's notable voice actors include Yui Ishikawa, Rie Takahashi and Risa Taneda.

Shanghai's Manjuu Ltd. provided the audiovisual design and the writing for Azur Lane. Xiamen's Yongshi Ltd. was responsible for programming, game data design and content. The companies share joint authorship of the game and share its copyright, with a 65%/35% share of its revenue.

Release
The game first launched in China in May 2017, published by Bilibili. Shanghai Yostar published the Japanese version in September that year. XD Global published the South Korean version in March 2018. The English-language version was announced as being in development in June 2018. Open beta began on August 16, 2018. On May 20, 2019, the English version was formally released along with the rollout of the 2019 UI overhaul.

Li Hengda, president of Yostar Inc., revealed that although he saw Azur Lanes potential, he did not expect the level of popularity the game experienced in Japan. Believing that around 10 people would suffice, Li later admitted his mistake in only having four full-time employees and two interns before the game's release, as they had to work from morning until midnight as the game's popularity grew until the end of 2017. Through Azur Lane, Yostar established contact with distinguished Japanese enterprises and creators and was met with welcoming responses. Tony Taka, known for his work on the Shining series, was delighted to be invited to provide character design for HMS Centaur (R06), marking his first work in a mobile game. Jin Haganeya, writer for Demonbane, agreed to write the script for the game's anime adaptation.

Artwork for the Korean release was provided by Korean artist Nardack. In March 2018, XD Global asked her to condemn the Korean radical feminist website Megalia after some players filed complaints accusing her of maintaining relations with the online community. Nardack refused to comply, and her artwork was then removed.

Promotion
A special program featuring voice actress Yui Ishikawa visiting the office of one of developers, Manjuu Ltd., in Shanghai was aired on the Japanese streaming television platform AbemaTV in May 2018. However, misuse during the program of the trademarked term  to refer to the game's personified warship characters led to Yostar being publicly warned by DMM.com, publisher of Kantai Collection. Yostar issued an apology, and called on players of Azur Lane to provide alternative terms for the game's personified warship characters. More than a thousand submissions were received. In September 2018, Yostar announced the new term would be "Kinetics Artifactual Navy-Self-regulative En-lore Node", abbreviated as "KAN-SEN" and is the backronym of the Japanese word .

Collaborations

In-Game

A January 2018 collaboration event with Compile Heart introduced protagonists of Hyperdimension Neptunia to Azur Lane. Players may obtain Neptunia protagonists with naval elements, as well as their "goddess forms" as separate characters.

In April 2018, Yostar and Wargaming Japan announced a collaboration between the game and World of Warships. Azur Lane players may obtain characters based on ships from World of Warships through a new interface called "Development Dock", while World of Warships players may purchase Azur Lane characters as voiced captains, and skins for ships based on design elements of Azur Lane namesake characters. In April 2019, the WoWS collaboration was further extended by season 2, introducing new characters into both games. In August 2020, the collaboration was once again extended by a 3rd season, introducing a wave of new ships, skins and captains in both games.

A collaboration with Sunrise Inc. in May 2018 featured a crossover plotline with the anime Armored Trooper VOTOMS. The Marshydog mecha from the show was added to Azur Lane as a furniture item. A collaboration event with Aquaplus in November 2018 made characters from the visual novel Utawarerumono obtainable in Azur Lane.

An April 2019 collaboration with Kizuna AI introduced the virtual YouTuber as 4 different in-game characters.

Between 27 November and 10 December 2019, seven Hololive members (Murasaki Shion, Nakiri Ayame, Ookami Mio, Natsuiro Matsuri, Minato Aqua, Shirakami Fubuki and Tokino Sora) became playable characters as part of another collaboration.

A November 2021 collaboration with anime television series SSSS.Gridman and SSSS.Dynazenon saw the introductions of 7 limited-time obtainable characters; Rikka Takarada, Akane Shinjō, Yume Minami, Hass, Namiko, Mujina and Chise Asukagawa.

Between 24 November and December 7, 2022, six new limited-time characters were introduced (Kala Ideas, Klaudia Valentz, Patricia Abelheim, Reisalin Stout, Lila Decyrus, and Serri Glaus) as part of the collaboration with two video games from the Atelier franchise developed by Gust Corporation; Atelier Ryza 2: Lost Legends & the Secret Fairy and Atelier Ryza 3: Alchemist of the End & the Secret Key (of which the latter is scheduled for release in Steam by 24 February 2023).

Miscellaneous
Yostar has held illustration contests with Japanese art community Pixiv to promote the game. Winners in a contest held in December 2017 were rewarded with cash and their designs featured on the game's loading screens. Winning designs from a wedding dress illustration contest in July 2018 were also planned to be implemented in the game.

Yostar licensed the Japanese company GRSPER to create virtual reality wedding ceremonies with the game's characters in August 2018. The crowdfunding project was cancelled in October 2018 because GRSPER did not meet its funding goal and was having communication difficulties with voice actors and their agencies.

In 2022, the game collaborated with Yamaha and its employee-run team, Iwata Racing Family (IRF), to race a YZF-R1 sports motorcycle that appears in-game as Essex's motorcycle at the Suzuka 8 Hours.

Other media

Print media
Azur Lane was adapted into several manga and novels. An official yonkoma comic, titled Azur Lane: Slow Ahead!, is being published in Ichijinsha's magazine Manga 4-koma Palette. It features the character based on HMS Javelin and three of the game's other protagonists. Chapters of Very Slow Advance! are regularly posted on the game's Japanese Twitter account as a means of promotion. Azur Lane Comic Anthology, a comic anthology series currently up to four volumes, is being published by Ichijinsha and sold on Amazon Japan. Azur Lane Queen's Orders, a manga centering around the characters based on HMS Queen Elizabeth and HMS Warspite, is being published by Ichijinsha in Comic Rex.  Azur Lane Comic à la Carte, another comic anthology, was published in October 2018.

Kodansha published a spin-off light novel featuring the character Laffey as protagonist, titled Starting My Life as a Commander with Laffey, in June 2018. Shueisha published another novelization, Episode of Belfast, featuring the character based on HMS Belfast, in June 2018. Overlap, Inc. published the third spin-off light novel featuring the character Ayanami as protagonist, titled Ayanami, Happily Married, in December 2018.

Console adaptation
Azur Lane Crosswave, a 3D shooter game for PlayStation 4 was announced in September 2018. Crosswave features Azur Lane characters battling against realistic warships and warplanes. The game follows a different story with new characters also making their debut. This console adaptation was developed by Felistella using Unreal Engine 4 and was published by Compile Heart on August 29, 2019. An English-language release was published by Idea Factory International in North America and Europe in 2020. The localization features Japanese voice-overs and sold in both digital and retail formats. A Nintendo Switch port of the game was released in Japan on September 17, 2020, and on February 16, 2021, in North America and in Europe on February 19, 2021.

Anime
An anime television series adaptation was announced in September 2018. The anime was directed by Tensho, director of Grisaia and Rewrite's anime adaptations, with writer Jin Haganeya, and Yasunori Nishiki composing the series' music. Tensho's Bibury Animation Studios is animating the series. Yostar head, Li Hengda, revealed that the animation project began in late 2017, when the game experienced its breakout in popularity. The choice of Haganeya to be the writer was due to the Demonbane franchise being one of Hengda's personal favorites. The series premiered on October 3, 2019, on Tokyo MX, SUN, KBS, BS11, and AT-X. May'n performed the series' opening theme song "graphite/diamond", while Kano performed the series' ending theme song "Hikari no Michishirube". Episodes 11 and 12 were originally scheduled to air on December 19 and 26, 2019, but were delayed to March 13 and 20, 2020, respectively, due to production issues. Funimation had licensed the series for a SimulDub. Following Sony's acquisition of Crunchyroll, the series was moved to Crunchyroll.

An anime adaptation of the Azur Lane: Slow Ahead! manga was announced on December 24, 2019.  The television series was directed by Masato Jinbo and written by Yū Satō at Yostar Pictures and CANDY BOX, with Hiromitsu Hagiwara designing the characters, and Shade composing the series' music.  Yokohama Animation Laboratory is credited for production cooperation. It aired from January 12 to March 30, 2021, on Tokyo MX, BS11, and AT-X. The opening theme song is "Longing for!" performed by Emi Nitta, while the ending theme song is  performed by Yui Sakakibara. Crunchyroll licensed the series. An OVA episode is bundle with the second Blu-ray volume, which was released on July 7, 2021.

An anime adaptation of the Azur Lane: Queen's Orders manga was announced on September 12, 2021, as part of the game's 4th anniversary (and 3rd anniversary in English). It was later revealed to be an OVA on September 10, 2022. The OVA is animated by Yostar Pictures and written by Yū Yamashita, with Masahide Yanagisawa, Yuzo Hirata and Niimura Kana designing the characters, and Daisuke Horita composing the music. The OVA's theme song is "Bloomin'" by Sumire Uesaka as her character Queen Elizabeth.

Azur Lane

Azur Lane: Slow Ahead!

Audio CDs

A CD featuring character songs sung by their respective voice actors was released in September 2018. A drama CD written by the author of Starting My Life as a Commander with Laffey was released on November 28, 2018.

Educational

Azur Lane produces an educational video series hosted on YouTube called Learning Ships of the World with Mikasa Dai-Senpai (:ja:三笠大先輩と学ぶ世界の艦船). Hosted by Mikasa, it highlights the real-life characteristics and histories of ships featured in the franchise. In the event that a featured ship still exists as a museum ship, live-action or documentary-style footage may be included. For example, for one of Belfast's episodes, footage was included of Azur Lane management visiting Belfast in the Pool of London in cooperation with Imperial War Museums, which currently operates Belfast as a branch.

Reception

Azur Lane was very popular in its home country, contributing to most of Bilibili's 2018 Q1 revenue along with the Chinese release of Fate/Grand Order. In Japan, the game enjoyed an overwhelming surge in popularity after its release, despite initial accusations by fans of Kantai Collection that it was a clone. After only four months, there were more than five million Japanese players. The first doujin convention dedicated exclusively to the game was held in November 2017. From May 2017 to August 2018, the game has earned US$170 million globally on the iOS AppStore. Chinese players spent $28 million, while Japanese players spent $139 million, accounting for approximately 82% of the game's sales.

The game scored within Japan's top five best games of 2017 in a Google Play user vote, as well as a first place in the app section of the Dengeki Online Awards 2017. In September 2018, the game was awarded third place in Game of the Year in the 15th China Animation & Comic Competition.

Azur Lanes popularity was attributed to its gameplay and game system design which were widely praised. RPG Site wrote the game "acts as an important lesson on how a Chinese-made title can gain popularity in Japan by offering originality in its gameplay". Famitsu liked how the game depended very little on luck, let players develop their own playstyle, and was easy to pick up and play due to few microtransaction elements. Japanese writer, actor and radio personality Mafia Kajita was impressed by the tight shooter controls. He felt the game systems were streamlined and avoided any nuisances, and believes the all-Japanese voice cast is likely a reason for its popularity.

Critics have also compared the game to Kantai Collection. Hong Kong media outlet HK01 found Kantai Collections complete lack of post-release improvements and overdependence on luck responsible for upsetting its own players, who switched contributing to Azur Lanes popularity. Mafia Kajita noted the two games had different focuses: Kantai Collection is centred on resource management while Azur Lane is a simulation game about dodging danmaku bullets while shooting the enemy. However, Shigetaka Kurita, director of Kadokawa Dwango corporation, criticized Azur Lane for lacking the sense of "tragedy and heroism" in Kantai Collection. Kurita described the game as "merely an idol action game with a fleet motif". He found the greatest appeal of Kantai Collection to be the "sorrow of the Imperial Japanese Navy" saying that one might cry while playing Kantai Collection but not Azur Lane.

Controversies 
In February 2021, one of the game's voice actresses, Ai Kayano, who made voice lines for Kaga, Atago, Renown, and Graf Zeppelin, was embroiled in controversy on Chinese social media as a result of her post regarding her February 11 trip to Yasukuni Shrine – a Shinto shrine known for the enshrinement of Japanese men, women, children, and soldiers died in numerous wars involving Japan spanning between the Meiji and Showa eras, including 1,068 souls of convicted war criminals that were sentenced to death by the International Military Tribunal; of which 14 of them, including former Japanese Prime Minister Hideki Tojo, are labelled as A-Class criminals. In response; amid backlash from some Chinese fans, her voice was removed from these characters, including other variants, from the Chinese servers of Azur Lane and are subsequently replaced in September 2022 by a number of voice actresses for their respective characters (Yuka Iguchi, Saeko Ouki, Ayako Kawatsumi, and Yumi Uchiyama). Similar action was also taken in other games such as removing Kayano's Platinum voice dialogues from Arknights, and while Kayano's voice dialogues remained available outside of Arknights' Chinese servers after the incident, her voice lines have since been replaced by Mizuki Kitajima for all servers by a flash update on October 24, 2021.

On February 24, 2022, due to unknown reasons, the comment sections of all Northern Parliament ships were removed from their respective sections. The game's event called "Abyssal Refrain", which involves Soviet ships like the one called , premiered on the same day that Russia began its invasion to Ukraine. On September 22, 2022, the comments section for all Northern Parliament ships has re-opened, as with the rollout of the new comment reporting feature that same day.

Notes

References

External links
 
  
 

2019 anime television series debuts
2021 anime television series debuts
2017 manga
2017 video games
2018 Japanese novels
2018 manga
2019 video games
Android (operating system) games
Anime television series based on video games
Bibury Animation Studios
Book series introduced in 2018
Compile Heart games
Crunchyroll anime
Free-to-play video games
Gacha games
Ichijinsha manga
IOS games
Kodansha books
Light novels
Manga based on video games
Military anime and manga
Military science fiction video games
Moe anthropomorphism
Nintendo Switch games
PlayStation 4 games
Science fiction video games
Seinen manga
Shōnen manga
Shoot 'em ups
Toho Animation
Unreal Engine games
Video games about World War II alternate histories
Video games developed in China
War video games
Windows games
Yonkoma